Summer is an album released by British opera soprano Summer Watson in 2003. It reached #2 on the UK classical chart.

Track listing
"Nella Fantasia"
"Aranjuez Ma Pensee"
"Palabra De Honor"
"Berceuse"
"Mal Di Luna"
"Tutta La Vita"
"Sposa Son Disprezzata"
"Cantique De Jean Racine"
"Morgen"
"Fragile"
"Song To The Moon"
"Cavatina"

2003 albums